Between Two Fires is the third solo album by English singer Paul Young. Released in October 1986, it reached No. 4 on the UK Albums Chart, and No. 77 on the US Billboard 200 album chart. The album has been certified Platinum (300,000 copies) by the British Phonographic Industry.

Between Two Fires follows the pattern of Young's first two albums combining cover versions with original songs written by Young and keyboard player Ian Kewley. However, after the numerous covers contained in the previous two works there were only two on this album with the Young/Kewley partnership contributing eight of the tracks, two co-written with bass player Pino Palladino.

Three singles were taken from the album; "Wonderland", "Some People", and "Why Does a Man Have to Be Strong", though none of these made the UK Top 20 unlike Young's previous singles. "Wonderland", written by Betsy Cook who also provided backing vocals on the album, reached No. 24 in the UK (Cook would later release her own version of the song on her 1992 album The Girl Who Ate Herself). "Some People" reached No. 56 in the UK and No. 65 in the US, while "Why Does a Man have to Be Strong" reached No. 63 in the UK.

Critical reception 
In a review for Rolling Stone, Laura Fissinger wrote: "Through the first few listens, the album seems muted and reticent, a bashful mishmash of pop riffs and references. But after those initial plays, Between Two Fires takes on remarkable colours, as if its ten tracks were strips of film coming to life in a photographer's darkroom. The record finally reveals itself to be a detailed portrait of the problems human beings have with sharing things – whether it's a whole planet or just a queen-size bed."

Track listing 
All tracks composed by Paul Young and Ian Kewley; except where indicated.
 "Some People" - 4:42
 "Wonderland" (Betsy Cook) - 4:56
 "War Games" (Andrew Barfield) - 4:16
 "In the Long Run" (Young, Kewley, Pino Palladino) - 4:14
 "Wasting My Time" - 5:11
 "Prisoner of Conscience" (Young, Kewley, Palladino) - 4:18
 "Why Does a Man Have to Be Strong?" - 4:19
 "A Certain Passion" - 4:12
 "Between Two Fires" - 3:48
 "Wedding Day" - 4:49
 "Steps to Go" - 5:12

Note
 Track 11 included on some CD releases.

Personnel 
 Paul Young – lead vocals, arrangements
 Matt Irving – keyboards 
 Ian Kewley – keyboards, Hammond organ, arrangements
 Steve Boltz – guitars, sitar
 Pino Palladino – bass, arrangements
 David Palmer – drums, drum programming
 Danny Cummings – percussion 
 Tony Jackson – backing vocals
 Hamish Stuart – backing vocals
 Betsy Cook – backing vocals

Production 
 Ian Kewley – producer 
 Paul Young – producer 
 Hugh Padgham – producer, engineer
 Pino Palladino – production assistance
 Paul "Croydon" Cook – assistant engineer
 Bob Ludwig – mastering
 Masterdisk (New York City, New York) – mastering location 
 Rob O'Connor – art direction, design 
 Stylorouge – art direction, design
 John Swannell – sleeve photography 
 Ged Doherty – management 
 Renegade Artists Management Ltd. – management company

Charts

Certifications

References 

1986 albums
Paul Young albums
Albums produced by Hugh Padgham
Columbia Records albums